Abda of Hira (died 680) was a monk of the Church of the East.

He was born at Al-Hirah, the son of Hanif. He became a monk under Mar Abda of Gamre. After having taught as a disciple by Mar Babai he later lived in a cave.  One of his miracle deeds was to have treated with healing oil a wound of a hunter who had been injured by a lion.
He preached Christianity to the Zoroastrian Persians and was said to have worked many miracles before dying in his cave in 680.

References

Sources
 Holweck, F. G. "A Biographical Dictionary of the Saints". St. Louis, MO: B. Herder Book Co., 1924.

Year of birth missing
680 deaths
Monks of the Church of the East
Assyrian Church of the East saints